Idan Rubin (born July 2, 1983) is an Israeli footballer formerly playing for Dunaújváros FC. He is the first Israeli to play in Hungary.

References

1983 births
Living people
Israeli Jews
Israeli footballers
Maccabi Herzliya F.C. players
Hapoel Herzliya F.C. players
Dunaújváros FC players
Israeli expatriate footballers
Expatriate footballers in Hungary
Israeli expatriate sportspeople in Hungary
Footballers from Herzliya
Association football forwards